Jimmy Duquennoy (9 June 1995 – 5 October 2018) was a Belgian cyclist, who rode professionally between 2015 and his death in 2018. Duquennoy died at age 23 after suffering cardiac arrest at his home in Wez-Velvain, Belgium.

Major results

2015
 7th Paris–Roubaix Espoirs
 7th Dwars door de Vlaamse Ardennen
2016
 8th Grote Prijs Marcel Kint
 9th Memorial Van Coningsloo
 10th Arnhem–Veenendaal Classic
2017
 9th Circuit de Wallonie
2018
 10th Dwars door West–Vlaanderen

References

External links

1995 births
2018 deaths
Belgian male cyclists
Sportspeople from Tournai
Cyclists from Hainaut (province)
21st-century Belgian people